Juan Nepomuceno Silva Meza (born 13 September 1944 in Mexico City), son of the writer Juan Silva Vega and professor Ana María Meza de Silva, is a Mexican jurist. He served as an Associate Justice (ministro) of the Supreme Court of Justice of the Nation since 26 January 1995, having previously served extensively elsewhere in the judiciary, including the Federal Electoral Tribunal. On 3 January 2011, he was elected Chief Justice for a term that ended on 31 December 2014.

He earned his law degree at the National Autonomous University of Mexico (UNAM). He was nominated to the Supreme Court by President Ernesto Zedillo in December 1994 and ratified by the Senate in January 1995. He is considered to belong to the Court's liberal wing. Silva was Chief Justice of Mexico's Supreme Court of Justice when the court received a United Nations Prize in the Field of Human Rights for 2013.

In January 2016 he joined the Faculty of Law of UNAM.

Publications

References

External links
 Suprema Corte de Justicia de la Nación Web pages of the Supreme Court of Mexico
 Mexico Court Orders 22 Tied to '97 Killings Freed New York Times August 12, 2009
 Mexican Court Finds No Violation of Rights in Jailing of Journalist New York Times November 30, 2007
 On the Mexican Supreme Court of Justice Ruling on the Halcones Case translation of article by Manuel Becerra Ramirez, Mexican Law Review, number 8, July–December 2007

1944 births
Living people
20th-century Mexican judges
Supreme Court of Justice of the Nation justices
People from Mexico City
National Autonomous University of Mexico alumni
Election people
Presidents of the Supreme Court of Justice of the Nation
21st-century Mexican judges